This is a list of schools in Carmarthenshire in Wales.

State primary schools

Abergwili VC Primary School
Abernant Community Primary School
Bancffosfelen Community Primary School
Bancyfelin Community Primary School
Beca Community Primary School
Betws Community Primary School
Bigyn Community Primary School
Blaenau Community Primary School
Brechfa Community Primary School
Bro Banw Community Primary School
Bro Brynach Community Primary School
Bryn Community Primary School
Bryn Teg Llanelli Community Primary School
Brynaman Community Primary School
Brynsaron Community Primary School
Burry Port Community Primary School
Bynea Community Primary School
Caeo Community Primary School
Cae'r Felin Community Primary School
Carreg Hirfaen Community Primary School
Carwe Community Primary School
Cefneithin Community Primary School
Cil-y-cwm VC Primary School
Copperworks Community Primary School
Cross Hands Community Primary School
Cwrt Henri Community Primary School
Cynwyl Elfed Community Primary School
Dafen Community Primary School
Drefach Community Primary School
Ferryside VC Primary School
Ffairfach Community Primary School
Ffwrnes Community Primary School
Five Roads Community Primary School
Gors-las Community Primary School
Griffith Jones Community Primary School
Gwenllian Community Primary School
Gwynfryn Community Primary School
Gymraeg Brynsierfel Community Primary School
Gymraeg Dewi Sant Community Primary School
Gymraeg Rhydaman Community Primary School
Hafodwenog Community Primary School
Halfway Community Primary School
Hendy Community Primary School
Johnstown Community Primary School
Lakefield Community Primary School
Laugharne VC Primary School
Llanddarog VC Primary School
Llandeilo Community Primary School
Llandybie Community Primary School
Llanedi Community Primary School
Llanfynydd VA Primary School
Llangadog Community Primary School
Llan-gain Community Primary School
Llangennech Infant Community Primary School
Llangennech Junior Community Primary School
Llangynnwr Community Primary School
Llanllwni VC Primary School
Llanmiloe Community Primary School
Llannon Community Primary School
Llanpumsaint Community Primary School
Llansadwrn Community Primary School
Llansawel Community Primary School
Llansteffan Community Primary School
Llanllwni VC Primary School
Llanwrda Community Primary School
Llanybydder Community Primary School
Llechyfedach Community Primary School
Llys Hywel Community Primary School
Maes y Morfa Community Primary School
Maes-y-bont Community Primary School
Meidrim Community Primary School
Model VA Primary School
Mynydd y garreg Community Primary School
Myrddin Community Primary School
Nantgaredig Community Primary School
Old Road Community Primary School
Parc y Tywyn Community Primary School
Parc-yr-hun Community Primary School
Pembrey Community Primary School
Penboyr VA Primary School
Peniel Community Primary School
Pentip VA Primary School
Penygaer Community Primary School
Penygroes Community Primary School
Pont-henri Community Primary School
Pont-iets Community Primary School
Pontyberem Community Primary School
Pwll Community Primary School
Rhys Prichard Llandovery Community Primary School
Richmond Park Community Primary School
St Mary's VA Primary School
St Mary's RC Primary School
Saron Community Primary School
Stebonheath Community Primary School
Swiss Valley Community Primary School
Talley Community Primary School
Teilo Sant Community Primary School
Tremoilet VC Primary School
Trimsaran Community Primary School
Tycroes Community Primary School
Tymbl Community Primary School
Y Bedol Community Primary School
Y Castell Community Primary School
Y Dderwen Community Primary School
Y Ddwylan Community Primary School
Y Felin Community Primary School
Y Fro Community Primary School

State secondary schools

Bro Myrddin Welsh Comprehensive School
Bryngwyn Comprehensive School
Coedcae School
Glan-y-Mor Comprehensive School
Queen Elizabeth High School
St John Lloyd Catholic Comprehensive School
Ysgol Bro Dinefwr
Ysgol Dyffryn Aman
Ysgol Dyffryn Taf School
Ysgol Gyfun Emlyn
Ysgol Maes Y Gwendraeth
Ysgol y Strade

Special schools
Coleg Elidyr
Heol Goffa Special School
Rhydygors Special School

Independent schools
Llandovery College
St Michael's School, Llanelli

 
Carmarthenshire